Dahiépa-Kéhi is a town in south-central Ivory Coast. It is a sub-prefecture of Gagnoa Department in Gôh Region, Gôh-Djiboua District.

Dahiépa-Kéhi was a commune until March 2012, when it became one of 1126 communes nationwide that were abolished.

In 2014, the population of the sub-prefecture of Dahiépa-Kéhi was 18,173.

Villages

References

Sub-prefectures of Gôh
Former communes of Ivory Coast